Water is a 1985 British comedy film directed by Dick Clement and starring Michael Caine. It was scripted by Clement and Ian La Frenais. The plot spoofs elements of the comedies Carlton-Browne of the F.O. (1958) and Passport to Pimlico (1948) and the then-recent invasions of the Falkland Islands and Grenada. Caine plays Baxter Thwaites, a Governor who has 'gone native' (similar to his role in The Honorary Consul), and Billy Connolly as local biracial activist Delgado, supported by the last performance of Leonard Rossiter, as Sir Malcolm Leveridge, and one of the last performances of Fulton Mackay.

Plot 
The story is set in the fictional Caribbean island and British colony of Cascara. Widely ignored by the British Government, media, and general public, local Governor Baxter Thwaites is having an easy life in his small and peaceful colony. That peace is disturbed when an abandoned oil rig starts delivering water - at the standard of the finest table water brands (and laxative companies, as it contains a substance that makes you "shit like clockwork"). Different parties, including Downing Street, the Cascara Liberation Front, the White House, French bottled water producers, and Cuban guerrillas take interest in the future of the island and threaten to destroy the cosy way of life enjoyed by the island's inhabitants.

Cast

 Michael Caine as Governor Baxter Thwaites
 Valerie Perrine as Pamela Weintraub
 Brenda Vaccaro as Dolores Thwaites
 Leonard Rossiter as Sir Malcolm Leveridge (final film appearance, released posthumously)
 Billy Connolly as Delgado Fitzhugh
 Chris Tummings as Garfield Cooper
 Dennis Dugan as Rob Waring
 Fulton Mackay as Reverend Eric McNab
 Jimmie Walker as Jay Jay
 Dick Shawn as Deke Halliday
 Fred Gwynne as Franklin Spender
 Trevor Laird as Pepito
 Alan Igbon as Cuban
 Maureen Lipman as Margaret Thatcher
Alfred Molina as Pierre
Bill Persky as TV director
Ruby Wax as Spenco Executive

Production

Development
The film was one of three movies that HandMade Films intended to shoot in 1984, the others being A Private Function and a comedy from John MacKenzie, The Travelling Man (which ultimately would not be made). It was written by the experienced comedy duo Ian La Frenais and Dick Clement, who had just made Bullshot (1983) for HandMade. "I guess it was like an Ealing film," said Clement, "but it was not a conscious effort to recreate that style. I can see the analogies with something like Passport to Pimlico."

Writing
Le Frenais and Clement had made a television pilot in the US with Bill Persky who came up with the idea of a fictional British colony in the Caribbean which sought independence. The three of them wrote a screenplay which Persky wanted to direct (he had made the film Serial (1980)) but they were unable to raise finance. Then when Clement and Le Frenais made Bullshot for Handmade they showed the script to Dennis O'Brien, head of the studio. "It was Denis who absolutely loved the script and really responded to it and said, 'Let's do it'," said Clement. The fictional island of Cascara, which was the Caribbean island of Saint Lucia, is a play on Cascara, a plant which has laxative properties because in the film a re-opened oil well is discovered to produce mineral water with a 'slight laxative effect'. After Clement and Le Frenais wrote another draft of the script, they sent it to Michael Caine, who loved it and wanted to be in the film. Clement says, "We were thrilled because we knew that meant we would get the film made, and suddenly it was a go project."

Casting

Denis O'Brien liked to use members of Monty Python in HandMade films and offered the role of Sir Malcolm Leveridge to John Cleese. Cleese read the script and turned it down; Leonard Rossiter played the role instead, in what turned out to be Rossiter's last film.

At the time Billy Connolly was an emerging comedian, much admired by Denis O'Brien. "They were always trying to put him into a movie because Denis was convinced that Billy Connolly was the funniest man in Britain," said Clement. "He was way ahead of the pack there." O'Brien insisted that Connolly be in Bullshot and Water. "He was actually cast before anybody else," said Clement.

Billy Connolly later recalled the making of the movie. "We went to Heathrow to fly out, and fly out we did. Not knowing that - there were no mobile phones then of course - they were racing up to tell us not to go. That the money had fallen through. But by the time the plane landed in Saint Lucia, they'd got the money again!"

The television presenter Paul Heiney played a small role in the film for an episode for the BBC series In at the Deep End.

Filming
The movie started filming in May 1984. The same month A Private Function also went into production and people who worked on that film felt their budget was sacrificed in order to fund Water.

Shooting took place mostly on Saint Lucia. There were few filmmaking facilities so items had to be shipped there by sea. Studio work was done at Shepperton Studios in London and the oil rig scenes were shot in Devon.

Dick Clement later said, "We were rewriting the ending as we went along and that's never good... In hindsight, I always think you need to get those decisions out of the way before you get on the set. But, on the whole, it was a good shoot. Michael Caine was a fantastic trouper on the film, he was really a joy to work with, enormously supportive. I can’t be more appreciative of his work on it and how professional he was. In a way, Michael had the straightest part in the film, he was almost the straight man. He kept saying to me, 'You realise I'm having to carry all the plot here?'"

Connolly said Caine "taught me so much, about how to be generous to other actors. We were climbing up a hill and we were being filmed from the top. Suddenly he went, oh! My leg! And he spoiled a whole take. So they said we're doing it again, and he whispered to me 'next time, move further to the right, they can't see you'. He was lovely."

George Harrison normally did not get too involved in production of HandMade's films. However, he helped out on Water by appearing in the concert at the end and getting his friends Eric Clapton and Ringo Starr to appear. "George was very leery of appearing in his own company's movies," says Clement, "that was a big help to the film. We called in a few favours and, obviously, the Harrison connection didn't hurt. We hoped that scene would be a big selling tool for the movie... didn't work out that way but it was a good idea."

The concert scene was shot in a single day at Shepperton Studios. Clapton, Starr and Harrison were paid the musician's minimum rate for a playback session on set.

Soundtrack
The soundtrack principally featured reggae music by Eddy Grant and was released by Ariston Records.

The Singing Rebel's Band consists of Eric Clapton, George Harrison, Ray Cooper, Jon Lord, Mike Moran, Chris Stainton and Ringo Starr, with backing singers Jenny Bogle and Anastasia Rodriguez. It spoofs The Concert for Bangladesh organised by Harrison in 1971.

Release 
The film premiered in London in January 1985. It was briefly in the top ten box office listing - along with A Private Function - but soon dropped out. It failed to recoup its costs and could not find an American distributor. When it was released there in April 1986 it failed at the box office there too.

Reception 
The film received a mixed review in the New York Times, which read in part "The folks who packaged this put-on operated on the theory that a lot of eccentric people doing nutty things produce hilarity. The ingredient missing from the fitfully amusing conglomeration of characters is a character for the whole. In kidding everything, the movie leaves us uncertain about whether anything is being seriously kidded."

The Los Angeles Times called it "so refreshingly funny that you're tempted to forgive its tendency to run dry in its last half-hour... boasts some of the wittiest lines heard on screen since A Private Function."

Dick Clement later reflected:
I'm happier with Bullshot than I am with Water. I think Water just misses. I feel it's not quite connecting in the right way. I look back on it and I'm fairly uncomfortable. For me I always did have a problem with fictional countries or places, I always like things rooted a little bit more in reality. I have a feeling that kind of thing works perhaps in fiction, but I always find that film is a very literal medium, you've got to sell stuff on the screen and I think it was larger than life in a way that isn't quite comfortable on screen and I don't think I pulled it off... And again in hindsight as much as I love Billy Connolly I think a black guy in that part would have been better. I think that would've helped the credibility of making it a Caribbean island.
Michael Palin later said the financial failure of the film "was a bit of a turning point in HandMade Films, that Water was such a disaster and yet so much money was put into it. Somehow the luck ran out because judgement up to that time had been pretty good."

Home media
Water was first released on home video by Paramount Home Video on 1 February 1987. The film received its first DVD edition in North America in 2006, courtesy of Anchor Bay Entertainment.

References

External links

 

Review of film at Variety

1985 films
1980s adventure comedy films
British adventure comedy films
Films about water
Films set in the Caribbean
Films set on fictional islands
Films shot in Saint Lucia
HandMade Films films
Films with screenplays by Dick Clement
Films directed by Dick Clement
Films with screenplays by Ian La Frenais
1985 comedy films
1980s English-language films
1980s British films